Fikret is a given name and may refer to:

 Fikret Abdić (born 1939), Bosnian politician and businessman
 Fikret Alić, Bosniak survivor of the 1992 Keraterm and Trnopolje concentration camps
 Fikret Amirov (1922-1984),Azerbaijani composer
 Fikret Arıcan (1912-1994), Turkish footballer
 Fikret Emek (born 1963), retired soldier from the Special Forces Command 
 Fikret Güler (born 1953), Turkish Taekwon-Do practitioner
 Fikret Hakan (born 1934), Turkish film actor
 Fikret Hodžić (1953-1992), professional bodybuilder from Bosnia and Herzegovina
 Fikret Kırcan (1919-2014), Turkish footballer
 Fikret Kızılok (1947–2001), Turkish musician
 Fikret Kuşkan (born 1965), Turkish actor
 Fikret Mujkić (born 1949), former Yugoslav and Bosnian footballer
 Fikret Orman (born 1967), Turkish businessman
 Fikret Özsoy (born 1965), Turkish javelin throw record holder
 Fikret Mualla Saygı (1904-1967), Turkish painter
 Fikrat Yusifov (born 1957), Azerbaijani economist 
 Tevfik Fikret (1867–1915), Ottoman poet
 Tevfik Fikret Ucar (born 1966), Turkish academic

Unisex
Turkish unisex given names